Enyalioides feiruzae is a species of wood lizard in the genus Enyalioides, from the Peruvian Yungas. 

Male members of the species are distinguished for their colourful "kaleidoscope" scales, while females generally possess green to brown scales. The species was named after a female pet green iguana, Feiruz, by Catherine Thomson, a Michigan resident who financially supports biodiversity and conservation research.

References
 

Reptiles described in 2021
Lizards of South America
Reptiles of Peru
Enyalioides